Feeler is the second studio album by Australian singer-songwriter Pete Murray. Released on 21 July 2003, the album peaked at number one on the Australian charts.

Background
In 2002, Pete Murray made an independent album The Game which prompted Sony Music Australia to sign him. In early 2003, Pete Murray and his band entered the studio with producer Paul McKercher and his band to make the Feeler album. On his website, Pete Murray outlines the type of record he was hoping to make. "The records I love by people like Nick Drake, Neil Young, Bob Dylan, they are built to last. I wanted this to be an album like that, something you can pull out in 30 years and still hear the feeling in it, rather than something that's dated by the musical fashions of the day."

Track listing
"Feeler" – 4:21
"Bail Me Out" – 4:03
"So Beautiful" – 4:39
"Lines" – 3:00
"Freedom" – 3:16
"Please" – 3:23
"Fall Your Way" – 3:44
"My Time" – 4:08
"Tonic" – 3:00
"No More" – 3:08
"Ten Ft Tall" – 4:28

Chart positions

Weekly charts

Year-end charts

Decade-end chart

Certifications

References

External links
Pete Murray Feeler information

2003 albums
Pete Murray (Australian singer-songwriter) albums